Citico can refer to:

 Citico (Tellico archaeological site) (40MR7) — A prehistoric and historic Native American site in Monroe County, Tennessee, USA
 Citico (Chattanooga, Tennessee) (40HA65) — a prehistoric and historic Native American site in modern Chattanooga, Tennessee, USA. 
Two streams, each called Citico Creek, associated with the Citico sites in Monroe and Hamilton counties in East Tennessee.
Citico Creek Wilderness — a wilderness area (part of the greater Cherokee National Forest) centered on the stream of the same name in Monroe County, Tennessee